The United States police-rank model is generally quasi-military in structure. A uniform system of insignia based on that of the US Army and Marine Corps is used to help identify an officer's seniority.

Ranks
Although the large and varied number of federal, state, and local police and sheriff's departments have different ranks, a general model, from highest to lowest rank, would be:
 Chief of police/commissioner of police/superintendent/sheriff: The title commissioner of police is used mainly by large metropolitan departments, while chief of police is associated with small and medium-sized municipalities; both are typically appointed by a mayor or selected by the city council or commission. In some cities, "commissioner" is the member of the board of officials in charge of the department, while a "chief" is the top uniformed officer answering to the commissioner or commission. In very large departments, such as the New York City Police Department, there may be several non-police officer deputy and assistant commissioners, some of whom outrank the chief of department and others on par with the uniformed chief. There may be a chief of operations who is second in command to the top-ranking chief. In contrast, sheriffs in the United States are usually elected officials, one in each county, who head the sheriff's department (or sheriff's office).
 Assistant chief of police/Undersheriff/assistant commissioner/assistant superintendent: Only seen in some departments. In New York City, assistant chiefs head borough commands.
 Deputy chief of police/deputy commissioner/deputy superintendent/chief deputy/Assistant Sheriff: The top subordinate of the chief of police, commissioner, superintendent, or sheriff; may or may not have a specific area of responsibility. In some places the undersheriff is the warden of the county jail. The New York City Sheriff's Office has five undersheriffs: each one is responsible for a borough of New York City, with the Sheriff of the City of New York overseeing all of them. In some Sheriff's Offices, the rank of Assistant Sheriff exists, below the Undersheriff, but still above Commander and other ranks.
 Inspector/commander: Sometimes have an insignia of a single star, analogous to brigadier generals, but in other areas wear a gold or silver eagle, similar to a colonel. "Inspector" is also used as a term for "detective" in the San Francisco Police Department but is two ranks above captain in the NYPD and the Philadelphia Police Department. In the NYPD, inspectors command divisions, which may be groups of precincts within a borough or specialized branches of the police service.
 Colonel or lieutenant colonel: A majority of state police as well as some municipal agencies use "colonel" or "lieutenant colonel" as their senior executive rank, often jointly with a civilian title such as "superintendent, deputy superintendent", "commissioner, deputy commissioner" or "director, deputy director", "Chief, Deputy Chief", etc. Conversely, the colonel or lieutenant colonel rank is rarely employed by other agencies, though it is used by the Baltimore Police Department and other Maryland agencies as either an executive or commander-like rank. Colonels generally wear the gold or silver eagle of a military colonel, and lieutenant colonels have the oak leaf of a Military lieutenant colonel, from the U.S. armed forces. Many sheriffs also wear the eagle insignia, and use colonel as an official rank.
 Major/deputy inspector: Sometimes Majors/Deputy Inspectors have the insignia of a gold or silver oak leaf, similar to a major or lieutenant colonel in the armed forces. In the Baltimore Police Department and Atlanta Police Department, majors supervise police stations.
 Captain: Two gold or silver bars ("railroad tracks"). A Captain often supervises a police station but can supervise another division or unit (detectives, patrol, etc.) in smaller departments and only certain sections of a police station in larger departments. In the NYPD, captains are the normal commanders of precincts.
 Lieutenant: Wearing a single gold or silver bar, a lieutenant supervises two to three or more sergeants. Lieutenants can supervise an entire watch shift in a police station or detective squad (narcotics, homicide, etc.) in larger police departments, entire barracks in state police departments, and entire precincts in smaller police departments.
 Sergeant: Three chevrons, a police officer who supervises an entire watch shift in smaller departments and areas of a precinct and individual detective squads in larger departments. Some agencies, such as the New Jersey State Police, use a para-militaristic range of sergeant ranks, such as staff sergeant and sergeant first class, in addition to the basic sergeant rank.
 Detective/inspector/investigator: An inspector/detective/investigator usually works in plain clothes. This may be in several classes that correspond to higher supervisory and pay grades. In the NYPD, the detective rank is technically a designation: detectives do not actually outrank police officers although they are in charge of cases and are often senior in years of service, and so have a certain degree of authority beyond police officers in specific situations. Detectives also perform undercover duties for some of their cases.
 Officer/deputy/trooper/corporal: A regular officer or deputy wears no rank insignia, and there may be several pay grades. Corporals, who may be senior officers or acting watch commanders, wear two chevrons. A police corporal is generally employed as an officer as an entry level supervisor position. These duties may include one or more of the following roles: 
 Detective
 Division supervisor
 Field training officer (FTO) (in some departments, field training officers are not given any supervisory powers and hold no higher rank than other officers).

Police corporals will often act as a lead officer in field situations when a sergeant is not present. The position is also referred to by some agencies as Agent.

In a few departments, such as New York City, Washington DC, and Baltimore, officers from the rank of lieutenant and up wear white shirts instead of the dark blue or black uniform shirts common to lower-ranked police officers. In Philadelphia the rank of sergeant and up wear white shirts. Command staff and ranking officers/supervisors may wear fretting ("scrambled eggs") on their hat visors.

Advancement from officer to captain is generally by appointment after successful completion of a series of examinations, and after the officer has sufficient time in grade. Grades above captain are generally by appointment of the chief or sheriff. In addition, there must be vacancies for a higher rank. In police departments, the second-highest rank is usually similar to a chief of staff. In a sheriff's office, the second-highest ranking person is often responsible for most operations, similar to a chief of police in a police department, because the Sheriff is often elected and in many cases is a politician rather than an experienced law enforcement officer.

Variations

Federal

United States Border Patrol

United States Capitol Police

United States Park Police

United States Marshals Service

United States Secret Service

Federal Bureau of Investigation

State

Alabama
Alabama Highway Patrol and Alabama Department of Public Safety

Alaska

Arizona
Arizona Department of Public Safety

Arizona Rangers

Arkansas

California
California Highway Patrol

California State Parks Peace Officer

Colorado

Connecticut

Delaware

Florida

Georgia

Hawaii

Idaho

Illinois

Indiana

Iowa

Kansas

Kentucky

Louisiana

Maine

Maryland

Massachusetts

Michigan

Minnesota

Mississippi

Missouri

Montana

Nebraska

Nevada

New Hampshire

New Jersey

New Mexico

New York

North Carolina

North Dakota

Ohio

Oklahoma

Oregon

Pennsylvania

Rhode Island

South Carolina

South Dakota

Tennessee

Texas
Texas Highway Patrol

Texas rangers

Utah

Virginia

Vermont

Washington

West Virginia

Wisconsin

Wyoming

Counties

Anne Arundel County, Maryland

Baltimore County, Maryland

Denver County, Colorado

East Baton Rouge, Louisiana

Jefferson County, Colorado

Kern County, California

Los Angeles County, California

Maricopa, Arizona

Central Marin, California

Miami-Dade, Florida

Nassau County, New York

Orange County, California

Pima County, Arizona

Riverside County, California

St. Louis, Missouri

San Bernardino County, California (Probation)

San Diego County, California

San Francisco County, California

Santa Barbara County, California

Santa Clara County, California

Shelby County, Tennessee

Suffolk County Police, New York

Suffolk County Sheriff, New York

Sullivan County, Tennessee

Ventura County, California

Cities

Albuquerque

Atlanta

Aurora

Bakersfield

Baltimore

Bishop

Boston

Charlotte

Chicago

Cleveland

Cincinnati

Colorado Springs

Columbus

Dallas

Denver

Detroit

Fort Worth

Fresno

Houston

Indianapolis

Irvine

Jacksonville

Juneau

Kingsburg

Las Vegas

Little Rock

Lexington, Massachusetts

Long Beach

Los Angeles

Los Angeles School Police Department

Los Angeles Airport Police

Louisville

Madera

Memphis

Miami

Modesto

Nashville

New Orleans

New York City

Norfolk

Oakland

Omaha

Philadelphia

Phoenix

Pittsburgh

Roseville

Sacramento

San Diego

San Francisco

San Jose

Salt Lake City

Seattle

Selma

St. Louis

Tampa

Tucson

Virginia Beach

Washington, DC

Other

Amtrak

Puerto Rico

United States Department of Veterans Affairs

See also
 Police uniforms in the United States

References

United States
Law enforcement in the United States